Isham is a masculine given name which may refer to:

 Isham Hardy (1899–1983), American football player
 Isham G. Harris (1818–1897), American politician, governor of Tennessee and senator
 Isham Jones (1894–1956), American bandleader, saxophonist, bassist and songwriter
 Isham F. Norris (1851–1928), African-American businessman and politician
 Isham Randolph (1684–1742), American planter, merchant, public official and shipmaster, maternal grandfather of Thomas Jefferson
 Isham Reavis (1836–1914), American jurist, associate justice of the Supreme Court of Arizona Territory
 Isham Shahruddin (born 1966), Malaysian former footballer
 Isham Singh, Indian politician

Masculine given names